CJDC is a Canadian radio station, broadcasting at 890 AM in Dawson Creek, British Columbia. The station, owned by Bell Media, airs a country format. CJDC broadcasts with a power of 10,000 watts day and night and uses a non-directional antenna daytime, and a two-tower directional antenna nighttime, to protect Class-A clear-channel stations KBBI Homer, Alaska and WLS Chicago, Illinois.

History
The station was launched on December 15, 1947 by local broadcaster Radio Station CJDC (Dawson Creek, BC) Ltd. as an affiliate of the CBC's Trans-Canada Network, broadcasting on 1350 AM. In 1959, the company also launched CJDC-TV, a CBC Television affiliate, and changed its corporate name to CJDC Ltd. At a later date, the corporate name was changed to Mega Communications.

The station adopted its current frequency of 890 AM in 1986, and added a rebroadcaster on 92.7 FM at Tumbler Ridge in 1988 with the callsign CJDC-1-FM.

The stations were sold to Okanagan Skeena Broadcasters in 1997, to Telemedia in 1999. Telemedia was later taken over by Standard Radio in 2002, and most of Standard's assets, including the CJDC stations, were in turn acquired by Astral in 2007, and were again acquired by Bell Media in 2013.

On May 28, 2019, as part of a country-wide format reorganization by Bell, CJDC rebranded as Pure Country 890.

Former logo

References

External links
 Pure Country 890
 
 

JDC
JDC
JDC
Dawson Creek
Radio stations established in 1947
1947 establishments in British Columbia